The flag of the West Indies Federation was used between 1958 and 1962. It bore four equally spaced narrow white stripes with a large orange-gold disc over the middle two lines in the center of the flag, undulating horizontally across a blue field representing the Caribbean Sea and the sun shining upon the waves. The flag was originally designed by Edna Manley. The flag is shown as 1:2; the upper two white stripes reflect the lower ones.

The official description given in the West Indies Gazette is "Flag approved has blue ground with four white horizontal wavy bars (the top pair of bars being parallel and the lower pair also parallel) and an orange sun in the centre." "Blue", unless qualified, usually means the same blue as in a Blue Ensign.  However, whatever the establishing resolution called for, many copies were made that were at variance with it, as variants often show a pale blue or Imperial blue field.

The naval ensign (used by coast guard vessels) was a British white ensign with the federal flag in the canton.

Flag flying days were Commemorative Days-the usual British flag flying days, and Federal Days-January 3, Inception of the Federation; February 23, Federation Day; and April 22, Inauguration of the Federal Parliament. Buildings with two flagstaffs were to fly the Union Jack and the Federation Flag on Commemorative Days and on Federal Days; the Union Jack at the staff on the left when facing the building. Buildings with only one staff were to fly the Union Jack on Commemorative Days and the Federation Flag on Federal Days.

Video clips of the flag at the 1960 Summer Olympics appear to show a red or bronze disc, lighter blue and the flag is symmetrical about both axes. The flag of the West Indies Federation was flown at the cricket test match between Australia and the West Indies held in Barbados in 1999. Despite the dissolution of the Federation in the 1960s and some countries and territories not being part of the Federation, the Caribbean nations compete together as one West Indies cricket team, but under a different flag.

See also
List of flags of the United Kingdom
Former parts of the West Indies Federation
Flag of Antigua and Barbuda
Flag of Barbados
Flag of Cayman Islands
Flag of Dominica
Flag of Grenada
Flag of Jamaica
Flag of Montserrat
Flag of Saint Christopher-Nevis-Anguilla
Flag of Saint Kitts and Nevis
Flag of Anguilla
Flag of Saint Lucia
Flag of Saint Vincent and the Grenadines
Flag of Trinidad and Tobago
Flag of the Turks and Caicos Islands

References

Observer's Book of Flags, I.O. Evans 1959
The Book of Flags, I.O. Evans 1960
Flags of the World, G. Carr 1961
West Indies Gazette Volume 1 No. 9, February 21, 1958

External links
 The Federal Flag document from The West Indies Federal Archives Centre
  
 West Indies Federation flag

National flags
Obsolete national flags
West Indies Federation
Flags introduced in 1958